Zongolica is a municipality located in the south zone in the State of Veracruz, about 100 km from state capital Xalapa. It has a surface of 63.34 km2. The name comes from Nahuatl Tzontli-coliuhqui 'crafty hair'.

The municipality of Zongolica is bordered to the north by Tequila and Omealca, to the east by Tezonapa, to the south by Puebla State and to the west by Los Reyes. It produces principally maize, orange fruit coffee and mango. The climate is cold-humid, with an average temperature of 17.4 °C, with rains in summer and autumn.

Every October, a festival is held to celebrate San Francisco de Asís, patron of the town, and in December there is a festival in honor of the Virgin of Guadalupe.

Zongolica is home to the Ixcohuapa people, who are known for cooking and consuming larvae of Arsenura armida.

Climate

Fauna
Zongolica catfish Rhamdia zongolicensis is named after Zongolica and only known from a single cave in the Sierra de Zongolica.

References

External links 

  Municipal Official webpage
  Municipal Official Information

Municipalities of Veracruz
Nahua settlements